Landmark University Secondary School is a Nigerian Christian secondary school located in Omu-Aran, Kwara State.

History
It was established 10 January 2011 by Living Faith Church Worldwide.

Facilities
It has hostel facilities for students to live in school, thus operating both day and boarding system.

See also 

 Christianity in Nigeria
 Education in Nigeria
 List of boarding schools
 List of schools in Nigeria
 Landmark University

References

External links
 

2011 establishments in Nigeria
Boarding schools in Nigeria
Christian schools in Nigeria
Co-educational boarding schools
Educational institutions established in 2011
Secondary schools in Kwara State